P. hastata may refer to:
 Pavonia hastata, Cav., a plant species in the genus Pavonia
 Phacelia hastata, the silverleaf scorpion-weed, a plant species
 Populus hastata, a synonym for Populus trichocarpa, a tree species
 Prosthechea hastata (Lindl.) W.E.Higgins (1997 publ. 1998), an orchid species in the genus Prosthechea

See also
 Hastata (disambiguation)